Rudolf Klapka (24 February 1895 – 11 September 1951) was a footballer, who represented Czechoslovakia at the 1920 Summer Olympics.

Klapka played in the goalkeeper position for FK Viktoria Žižkov when he was selected for the first Czechoslovakian team who would represent the country at the Summer Olympics in Antwerp, the country's first ever match was against Yugoslavia which they won 7-0, the next day they played Norway and Klapka again did not concede as they won 4-0, Klapka conceded his first goal in the semi-final match against France which they won 4-1.
In the final against the hosts Belgium, Klapka conceded two goals in the first 30 minutes and then after 40 minutes Klapka and his team walked off in protest due to poor refereeing after a defender was sent-off, so the team were disqualified and did not receive a medal.

References

1895 births
1951 deaths
Czech footballers
Czechoslovak footballers
Czechoslovakia international footballers
Olympic footballers of Czechoslovakia
Footballers at the 1920 Summer Olympics
FK Viktoria Žižkov players
Association football goalkeepers
Footballers from Prague